Half a Love is the eighth album by American soul group The Chi-Lites, produced and largely written by lead singer Eugene Record.  The album was released in 1975 on the Brunswick label.

History
Half a Love was the group's final album for Brunswick, which was in serious financial trouble by 1975.  Half a Love contains only six new tracks, supplemented by four tracks from earlier Chi-Lites albums.  Brunswick's problems meant that the album received minimal promotion in the US, where it could only reach #41 on the R&B chart.  The only single release "It's Time for Love" likewise stalled in the lower reaches of both the pop and R&B charts, but did become a top 5 hit in the UK.

After the release of Half a Love, The Chi-Lites released three further non-album singles for Brunswick before leaving the company in 1976.  Their final Brunswick release "You Don't Have to Go" passed by largely unnoticed in the US, but was a major 1976 summer hit in the UK where it became jointly the group's highest-charting single, matching the #3 position reached by "Have You Seen Her" over four years earlier.  The 1999 Edsel Records reissue of Half a Love includes the final three singles as bonus tracks; they can also be found on the same company's 2004 UK-issue compilation The Complete The Chi-Lites on Brunswick Records: Volume 2.

Track listing

 Tracks 3 & 8 originally released on Chi-Lites (1973)
 Tracks 4 & 10 originally released on A Lonely Man (1972)

Charts

Singles

References

External links
Half a Love at Discogs

1975 albums
The Chi-Lites albums
Brunswick Records albums
Albums produced by Eugene Record